Orsi is an italian surname, and may refer to:

Last name 
 Adolfo Orsi (1888–1972), Italian industrialist, owner of Maserati
 Anaïs Orsi, climate scientist
 Benedetto Orsi (died 1680), Italian painter 
 Carlo Orsi (fl. 1884–1894), Italian painter and sculptor
 Clodomil Orsi, Brazilian football executive, Corinthians Chairman in 2007
 Dan Orsi (born 1992), Scottish footballer
 Danilo Orsi-Dadomo (born 1996), British footballer
 Favio Orsi (born 1974), Argentine football player and manager
 Federico Ferrari Orsi (1886-1942), Italian general in the Royal Army during World War II
 Fernando Orsi (born 1959), Italian football manager and former player
  (born 1966), Italian politician
 Ginger Orsi (born 1984), American child actress and singer, sister of Leigh Ann Orsi
 Giuseppe Agostino Orsi (1692–1761), Italian cardinal, theologian, and ecclesiastical historian
 Giuseppe Orsi (born 1945), Italian industrialist
  (1885-1911), Italian army officer died in Sciara Sciat, Libya, awarded posthumously the Gold Medal of Military Valour
 Guillermo Orsi (born 1946), Argentine journalist and novelist
 Hoover Orsi (born 1978), Brazilian race car driver
 John Orsi (1908–1978), American football player
 Kalvin Orsi (born 1997), Scottish football winger 
 Leigh Ann Orsi (born 1981), American actress and dancer, sister of Ginger Orsi
 Lelio Orsi (1508/1511–1587), Italian Renaissance painter
 Marco Orsi (born 1990), Italian swimmer
 Micaela Orsi (born 1993), Uruguayan model
 Ni Orsi Jr. (born 1944), American alpine skier
 Paolo Orsi (1859–1935), Italian archaeologist and classicist
 Phil Orsi (born 1939), American singer, songwriter, producer and musician
 Prospero Orsi (1560s-1630s), Italian painter of the late-Mannerist and early-Baroque period
 Raimundo Orsi (1901–1986), Argentinian-Italian footballer
 Robert Orsi (born 1953), American scholar
 Rocío Orsi (1976-2014), Spanish philosopher and professor
 Romeo Orsi, Italian industrialist and manufacturer of wind instruments, founder of Orsi Instrument Company
 Tranquillo Orsi (1771–1845), Italian painter, scenographer, and architect
 Viktoria Orsi Toth (born 1990), Italian beach volleyball player
 Yamandú Orsi (born 1967), Uruguayan politician

First name 
Orsi is also a short form of female Hungarian first name Orsolya and may refer to:
 Orsi Kocsis (born 1984), Hungarian model
 Orsi Tóth (born 1981), Hungarian actress

See also
 Orsi Instrument Company (est. 1836), a clarinet maker
 Palazzo Orsi Mangelli, a Baroque architecture palace in Forlì, Italy
 , or Orsi, Italian maker of agricultural machines
 Orsi Point, a headland in Malta on which Fort Ricasoli was built
 Orsi Tower and Battery, a tower and battery on the headland (destroyed)
 D'Orsi
 Achille D'Orsi (1845–1929), Italian sculptor
 Orsy (disambiguation)

Italian-language surnames